Spartaco Landini (31 January 1944 – 16 April 2017) was an Italian football defender and later a manager.

Club career
During his club career, Landini played for F.C. Internazionale Milano, U.S. Città di Palermo and S.S.C. Napoli in Serie A.

International career
Landini earned 4 caps for the Italy national football team in 1966, and participated in the 1966 FIFA World Cup.

After retirement
After he retired from playing football, Landini became one of Genoa C.F.C.'s directors.

Personal life
Spartaco's brother, Fausto Landini, also played football professionally, as a forward.

Spartaco Landini died in Genova on 16 April 2017 at the age of 73.

References

External links
 Profile at Inter.it
 
 Profile at FIGC 

1944 births
2017 deaths
Italian footballers
Italy international footballers
1966 FIFA World Cup players
Inter Milan players
Palermo F.C. players
S.S.C. Napoli players
Serie A players
Association football defenders
Sportspeople from the Province of Arezzo
Footballers from Tuscany